Pickers Ditch Meadow is a 1.9 hectare Local Nature Reserve in Clacton-on-Sea in Essex. It is owned and managed by Tendring District Council.

The site runs along the bank of Pickers Ditch, a tributary of Holland Brook. A footpath runs through the grassland site, and hedges have been planted along the border to screen it.

There is access from Thorpe Road.

References

Local Nature Reserves in Essex
Meadows in Essex